Melody and Romance is a 1937 British musical comedy film directed by Maurice Elvey and starring Hughie Green, Margaret Lockwood and Jane Carr. It was made at Beaconsfield Studios with sets designed by Norman G. Arnold, and features an uncredited appearance by Charles Hawtrey reciting Hamlet's "To be, or not to be."

Plot summary
Two teenagers with aspirations to become stars fall in love.

Main cast
 Hughie Green as Hughie Hawkins 
 Margaret Lockwood as Margaret Williams 
 Alastair Sim as Professor Williams 
 Jane Carr as Kay Williams 
 Garry Marsh as Warwick Mortimer 
 C. Denier Warren as Captain Hawkins 
 Julian Vedey as Jacob 
 Margaret Scudamore as Mrs Hawkins

Production
It was one of the earliest roles of Margaret Lockwood.

References

Bibliography
 Low, Rachael. Filmmaking in 1930s Britain. George Allen & Unwin, 1985.
 Wood, Linda. British Films, 1927-1939. British Film Institute, 1986.

External links

Melody and Romance at TCMDB

1937 films
1937 musical comedy films
1930s English-language films
Films directed by Maurice Elvey
British musical comedy films
Films shot at Beaconsfield Studios
British black-and-white films
1930s British films